GTS Serenade of the Seas is a  operated by Royal Caribbean International. She was completed in 2003.

History

The ship was built at Meyer Werft yard in Papenburg, Germany and is registered in Nassau, Bahamas. She completed her maiden voyage on 25 August 2003.

The ship was the first Royal Caribbean cruise ship to visit Alaska since 2019; her first voyage there departed Seattle, Washington, on 19 July 2021.

On 21 October 2021, Royal Caribbean announced that Serenade of the Seas will sail a 274-day itinerary, the longest offered by any cruise line, called the Ultimate World Cruise. She is scheduled to depart from Miami on 10 December 2023, and will visit 65 countries, including Morocco, Australia, and Brazil. Prices for guests range from US$61,000 to US$112,000.

Layout
Serenade of the Seas is a gas-turbine vessel. This system produces higher efficient speeds than other cruise ships, and lower emissions than diesel cruise ships, but its drawback is higher fuel consumption as well as the demand for higher quality fuel. There are 12 passenger decks, serviced by 9 passenger elevators (6 of which are glass and either look over the Centrum atrium or outside the ship through a glass wall). There are a total of 1,055 passenger cabins.

Homeports

Serenade of the Seas sails the Caribbean, departing from her home port of Tampa, Florida, during the winter months. During the summer months, Serenade of the Seas sails the Baltic Sea leaving from the home ports of Copenhagen, Denmark, or Stockholm, Sweden. Starting in August 2016, Serenade of the Seas started sailing out of Boston, Massachusetts until the beginning of October when the ship relocated back to Florida. Starting in May 2020, Serenade of the Seas was scheduled to sail out of Vancouver, British Columbia until the beginning of September when the ship relocated to Sydney, Australia, however, due to the COVID-19 pandemic, these sailings have been canceled.

Serenade of the Seas was the first major cruise ship to return to service in Alaska from Seattle, departing from Pier 91, Seattle on 19 July 2021, and then every Monday until 27 September 2021.

See also
 Royal Caribbean International

References

External links

 
 

2002 ships
Panamax cruise ships
Ships built in Papenburg
Ships of Royal Caribbean International